The 2013–14 Texas Longhorns men's basketball team represented the University of Texas at Austin in the 2013–14 NCAA Division I men's basketball season. Their head coach was Rick Barnes, who was in his 16th year as head coach. The team played their home games at the Frank Erwin Center in Austin, Texas and were members of the Big 12 Conference. They finished the season 24–11, 10–6 in Big 12 play to finish in a tie for third place. They advanced to the semifinals of the Big 12 tournament where they lost to Baylor. They received an at-large bid to the NCAA tournament where they defeated Arizona State in the second round before losing in the third round to Michigan.

Before the season

Departures

Recruiting

Schedule

Source:

|-
!colspan=9 style="background:#CC5500; color:white;"| Non-conference regular season

|-
!colspan=9 style="background:#CC5500; color:white;"| Conference season

|-
!colspan=9 style="background:#CC5500; color:white;"| Big 12 Tournament

|-
!colspan=9 style="background:#CC5500; color:white;"| NCAA tournament

Roster

References

Texas
Texas Longhorns men's basketball seasons
Texas
2013 in sports in Texas
2014 in sports in Texas